The 2008 Coupe de France Final was a football match that was held at the Stade de France in Saint-Denis, France on 24 May 2008. It was the 90th final in the Coupe de France's history. The final was contested between Paris Saint-Germain and Olympique Lyonnais. This was PSG's 10th appearance in the Coupe de France final, having won the cup in 1982, 1983, 1993, 1995, 1998, 2004, and 2006. They also lost in the final twice in 1985 and 2003. With a win in this year's final, PSG would have been granted the rare cup double with their last double coming in 1998. This was Olympique Lyonnais's 7th appearance in the final having won in 1964, 1967, and 1973. They lost in the final three times in 1963, 1971, and 1976.

Road to the Final

Match information

In front of a sell-out crowd of 80,000+ fans, Olympique Lyonnais and Paris Saint-Germain stepped on the pitch of the Stade de France to contest the 90th Coupe de France. PSG tore Lyon's defense ragged for most of the game and had a goal by Sylvain Armand incorrectly ruled offside. Olympique Lyonnais held on to 0–0 after 90 minutes, winning the match in extra time.

The majority of the first half was mainly dominated by PSG who thrived on Lyon's turnovers using them in order to counterattack. Lyon players, becoming frustrated, committed several malicious challenges leading to the likes of Anthony Réveillère and Sébastien Squillaci picking up yellow cards. The second half was partially even with both teams attempting to counterattack each other with both displaying fatigue as the second half moved forward. Both PSG and Lyon had several chances. Lyon's primary chances were as a result of Juninho's free kicks, while PSG probably had the best chance of the night when Amara Diané got through in the box and had a great chance, however it was miraculously saved by Grégory Coupet, who was playing his last match in a Lyon jersey, leaving the match up for grabs as they headed to extra time. One notable moment of the second half was the substitution of Pauleta, who was playing his final match for PSG. He was given a standing ovation by PSG supporters.

The first half of extra time was progressively slow with both clubs trying to get a strategic view of each other. It wasn't until the end of the first half of extra time when a goal was finally conceded. Following a cross by Karim Benzema, Sidney Govou pounced on the loose ball in the box after it went off Kader Keïta to give Lyon the lead after 102 minutes of play. Following the goal, Lyon finally settled down and opted to a more defensive style of play utilizing the offside trap and holding on to the ball more turning the tables on PSG, who were now becoming frustrated, with Mario Yepes delivering a questionable elbow on Benzema. Sidney Govou's goal would eventually be the only goal of the match giving Lyon their first Coupe de France title victory in 35 years. With the win in the final, Lyon were also granted their first ever double having won Ligue 1 this past season.

Since both clubs have automatically qualified for European competitions, PSG via the Coupe de la Ligue, Lyon via Ligue 1, the Coupe de France European place was reverted to the league. The spot was awarded to AS Saint-Étienne, ironically Lyon's primary rivals.

Match details

References
Coupe de France official homepage on FFF site
Coupe de France Page on LFP site
Coupe de France Results

Final
2008
Olympique Lyonnais matches
Paris Saint-Germain F.C. matches
Coupe De France Final
Sport in Saint-Denis, Seine-Saint-Denis
Coupe De France Final